Urša is a Slovene feminine given name.

It may refer to:

 Urša Bežan, Slovenian swimmer
 Urša Bogataj, Slovenian ski jumper
 Urša Kragelj, Slovenian canoeist
 Urša Pintar, Slovenian cyclist
 Urša Raukar-Gamulin, Croatian actress and activist

See also
 Urška

Slovene feminine given names